Marcus H. Holcomb (November 28, 1844 – March 5, 1932) was an American politician who served as the 66th governor of Connecticut, the attorney general of Connecticut, and as a member of the Connecticut Senate.

Biography
Holcomb was born in New Hartford, Connecticut on November 28, 1844, son of Carlos Holcomb and Adah L. Bushnell, and a descendant of the immigrant Thomas Holcomb. He studied in the public school system New Hartford. He then studied at Wesleyan Seminary in Massachusetts. He was married to Sarah Carpenter Bennet on October 16, 1872. They had one son, Marcus Hensey Holcomb Jr., who died in infancy.

Career 
Holcomb taught school for a number of years, while studying law in the office of the Hon. Jared B. Foster;  and was admitted to the bar in 1871. He was for thirty years president of the Southington Savings Bank and a director in the Southington Bank and Trust Company, the National Fire Insurance Company, and the Peck, Stow & Wilcox Company, the Aetna Nut Company, and the Southington Hardware Company.

While a judge of Southington's probate court from 1873 to 1910, Holcomb switched from Democratic Party to Republican in 1888. He was Hartford's treasurer from 1893 to 1908, a member of the Connecticut State Senate from 1893 to 1894. He was a delegate to Connecticut state constitutional convention, 1902; speaker of the Connecticut House of Representatives from 1905 to 1906, and Connecticut Attorney General from 1906 to 1907. He was Connecticut state attorney general from 1907 to 1910, and superior court judge in Connecticut from 1910 to 1915.

Becoming the Governor of Connecticut in 1915, Holcomb was reelected in 1916 and 1918. During his terms, the state of Connecticut prepared for the First World War. A food supply council and a state council of defense were established. Connecticut's debt was reduced and a bill was enacted that regulated maximum working hours for women. Teacher retirement benefits, old-age annuities, and health insurance programs also were instituted. However he became a storm center when he refused to convene the Connecticut Legislature to act on ratification of women's Suffrage Amendment to the US Constitution because of his personal opposition to it. He left office on January 5, 1921.

Death and legacy
Holcomb died on March 5, 1932, aged 87 years, 98 days, in Southington, Connecticut. He is interred at Oak Hill Cemetery, Southington, Connecticut.

Holcomb's former home at 76 Main St., on the Green in downtown Southington, still stands. It is at present the site of the Southington Masonic Temple, Friendship Lodge #33, of which he was a past Secretary. The Holcomb School on Main Street in Southington was named in his honor when it opened in 1926. At the time it was the town's largest grammar school. It closed to students in 1974 and was converted into the headquarters of the town's police department in 1981. The building was razed in 2004.

The Marcus Holcomb Residence Hall, an all-female dormitory built in 1921 and located on the Storrs campus of the University of Connecticut, was named in his honor. Holcomb vetoed the bill that appropriated funds for construction of the dormitory, but ultimately signed the bill.

References

Further reading
 Sobel, Robert and John Raimo. Biographical Directory of the Governors of the United States, 1789-1978. Greenwood Press, 1988.

External links
 Connecticut State Library
The Political Graveyard
National Governors Association

1844 births
1932 deaths
Connecticut state court judges
Members of the Connecticut House of Representatives
Connecticut state senators
Connecticut Attorneys General
Governors of Connecticut
People from New Hartford, Connecticut
Republican Party governors of Connecticut
Connecticut Republicans
Connecticut Democrats
People from Southington, Connecticut
19th-century American judges
Baptists from Connecticut
Schoolteachers from Connecticut
American bank presidents
20th-century American judges
City and town treasurers in the United States
19th-century American lawyers
19th-century American educators